The University of Vienna is a public research university located in Vienna, Austria. Founded by Duke Rudolph IV in 1365, it is the oldest university in the German-speaking world and among the largest institutions of higher learning in Europe. The university is associated with 16 Nobel prize winners and has been the home to many scholars of historical and academic importance.

History

Middle Ages to the Enlightenment
The university was founded on March 12, 1365, by Rudolf IV, Duke of Austria, hence the name "Alma Mater Rudolphina". After the Charles University in Prague and Jagiellonian University in Kraków, the University of Vienna is the third oldest university in Central Europe and the oldest university in the contemporary German-speaking world; it remains a question of definition as the Charles University in Prague was German-speaking when founded, too. However, Pope Urban V did not ratify the deed of foundation that had been sanctioned by Rudolf IV, specifically in relation to the department of theology. This was presumably due to pressure exerted by Charles IV, Holy Roman Emperor, who wished to avoid competition for the Charles University in Prague.

The pope later granted an endowment to the university in 1365, while papal assent was finally received in 1384. This led to the University of Vienna and its Faculty of Catholic Theology being granted the status of a full university. The first university building opened in 1385. It grew into the biggest university of the Holy Roman Empire, and during the advent of Humanism in the mid-15th century was home to more than 6,000 students.

In its early years, the university had a partly hierarchical, partly cooperative structure, in which the Rector was at the top, while the students had little said and were settled at the bottom. The Magister and Doctors constituted the four faculties and elected the academic officials from amidst their ranks. The students, but also all other Supposita (university members), were divided into four Academic Nations. Their elected board members, mostly graduates themselves, had the right to elect the Rector. He presided over the Consistory which included procurators of each of the nations and the faculty deans, as well as over the University Assembly, in which all university teachers participated. Complaints or appeals against decisions of faculty by the students had to be brought forward by a Magister or Doctor.Being considered a Papal Institution, the university suffered a setback during the Reformation. In addition, epidemics, economic stagnation and the first Siege of Vienna by Ottoman forces had devastating effects on the city, leading to a sharp decline in enrollment. For Emperor Ferdinand I, this meant that the university should be tied to the church to an even stronger degree, and in 1551 he installed the Jesuit Order there. As time went on, conflicts between the Jesuit school and the university arose. This led Emperor Ferdinand II, in 1623, to pass a law that incorporated the Jesuit College into the university. It was only in the mid-18th century that the Jesuits lost influence over the university and when Empress Maria Theresa ensured that the university went under the control of the monarchy. The university would later focus on the education of physicians and civil servants. Her successor Joseph II continued her reforms and further liberalized the university, abolishing official attire and allowing both Protestants and Jews to enroll by 1782, as well as introducing German as the compulsory language of instruction the year later.

Modern history

Significant changes were instituted in the wake of the Revolution in 1848, with the Philosophical Faculty being upgraded into equal status as Theology, Law and Medicine. Led by the reforms of Leopold, Count von Thun und Hohenstein, the university was able to achieve a larger degree of academic freedom. The current main building on the Ringstraße was built between 1877 and 1884 by Heinrich von Ferstel. The previous main building was located close to the Stuben Gate (Stubentor) on Iganz Seipel Square, current home of the old University Church (Universitätskirche) and the Austrian Academy of Sciences (Österreichische Akademie der Wissenschaften). Women were admitted as full students from 1897, although their studies were limited to Philosophy. The remaining departments gradually followed suit, although with considerable delay: Medicine in 1900, Law in 1919, Protestant Theology in 1923 and finally Roman Catholic Theology in 1946. Ten years after the admission of the first female students, Elise Richter became the first woman to receive habilitation, becoming professor of Romance Languages in 1907; she was also the first female distinguished professor.

In the late 1920s, the university was in steady turmoil because of anti-democratic and anti-Semitic activity by parts of the student body. Professor Moritz Schlick was killed by a former student while ascending the steps of the university for a class. His murderer was later released by the Nazi regime. Following the Anschluss, the annexation of Austria into Greater Germany by the Nazi regime, in 1938 the University of Vienna was reformed under political aspects and a huge number of teachers and students were dismissed for political and "racial" reasons. In April 1945, the then 22-year-old Kurt Schubert, later acknowledged doyen of Judaic Studies at the University of Vienna, was permitted by the Soviet occupation forces to open the university again for teaching, which is why he is regarded as the unofficial first rector in the post-war period. On 25 April 1945, however, the constitutional lawyer Ludwig Adamovich senior was elected as official rector of the University of Vienna. A large degree of participation by students and university staff was realized in 1975, however, the University Reforms of 1993 and 2002 largely re-established the professors as the main decision makers. However, also as part of the 2002 reform, the university, after more than 250 years of being largely under governmental control, finally regained its full legal capacity. The number of faculties and centers was increased to 18, and the whole of the medical faculty separated into the new Medical University of Vienna.

Campus

The University of Vienna does not have one single campus. Historically, the university started functioning from the First District near the Jesuit Church. Now, the academic facilities occupy more than sixty locations throughout the city of Vienna. The historical main building on the Ringstraße constitutes the university's centre and is commonly referred to as "die Uni". Most other larger university facilities and lecture halls are located nearby in the area of Vienna's First and Ninth District: the so-called new Lecture Hall Complex (Neues Institutgebäude, NIG), the lecture hall complex Althanstraße (UZA), the campus on the premises of the Historical General Hospital of Vienna, the Faculty of Law (Juridicum) and others. The Botanical Garden of the University of Vienna is housed in the Third District, as are the Department of Biochemistry and related research centres.

Also worth mentioning is the Vienna Observatory, which belongs to the university, and the Institute for University Sports (USI), which offers training and recreational possibilities to all students of the university. In addition, the University of Vienna maintains facilities outside of Vienna in the Austrian provinces of Lower Austria, Upper Austria, and Carinthia. These are mainly research and experimental departments for Biology, Astrophysics and Sports.

The University Library 

The University Library of the University of Vienna comprises the Main Library and the 50 departmental libraries at the various university locations throughout Vienna. The library's primary responsibility is to the members of the university; however, the library's 350 staff members also provide access to the public. Use of the books in the reading halls is open to all persons without the need for identification, which is only required for checking out books. The library's website provides direct access to information such as electronic journals, online indices and databases.

Library history 
Rudolf IV had already provided for a publica libraria in the Foundation Deed of 12 March 1365, where the valuable books bequeathed by deceased members of the university should be collected. Through many legacies, this collection was subsequently greatly increased and became the basis of the old Libreye that was accommodated in the same building as the student infirmary. In addition, there were libraries in the separate Faculties and in the Duke's College.

From the 17th century onwards, interest in the old library, with its manuscripts and incunabulae, went into decline and the modern library in the Jesuit College came to the fore. In 1756, the oldest university library was finally closed down and its books, 2,787 volumes, were incorporated into the Court Library, of which Gerard van Swieten was then director. After the dissolution of the Jesuit order (1773), the new "Academic Library" was created out of the book collections of the five Lower Austrian Colleges and many duplicates from the Court Library. This was opened on 13 May 1777, the birthday of Maria Theresa of Austria, in the building of the Academic College. Initially, the stock consisted of some 45,000 books and during Emperor Joseph II's dissolution of the monasteries, this was soon considerably extended. In contrast to its antecedents, the new library was open to the general public. Between 1827 and 1829, it acquired the classicist extension (Postgasse 9) to the Academic College, in which it was to be accommodated until 1884. In this year, the main library, with some 300,000 books, moved to Heinrich von Ferstel's new Main Building on the Ring, where stacks for some 500,000 volumes had already been prepared. With an annual growth of up to 30,000 volumes, the surplus space was soon filled. Book storage space had to be extended continuously. One hundred years later, the complete library, including departmental and subject libraries, comprised more than 4.3 million volumes. Today, Vienna's University Library is the largest collection of books in Austria, still facing problems of space. In addition to the Main Library, which alone has to cope with an annual growth of 40,000 volumes, it includes three Faculty Libraries, 32 Subject Libraries and 26 Departmental Libraries.

Library statistics 
 Book inventory: 7,650,412 (of which 2,900,936 belong to the Main Library)
 Journals: 10,100 in print, 80,000 E-Journals
 Active borrowers:
 Search queries in the online catalogue: 10,942,100
 Borrowings and renewals of books: 3,604,707
 Oldest book: Pliny the Elder, Historia naturalis (1469) digital Full text

Organization

The University of Vienna, like all universities and academies in Austria, once featured a system of democratic representation. Power in the university was divided equally among three groups: students (the largest group), junior faculty and full professors. All groups had the right to send representatives to boards, who then voted on almost every issue. From 2002 on, the government of Austria, headed by chancellor Wolfgang Schüssel, reformed the university system, transforming the institutions into legal entities, but also concentrating power in the hands of the full professors. The reform also introduced a board of governors and tuition fees. In 2013, those amounted to about €381 per semester for students from Austria, the European Union as well as some non-EU countries, while students from developed non-EU countries usually pay double that amount. The reforms also separated the medical departments into separate medical schools, such as the Medical University of Vienna.

Programmes

Students at the university can select from 181 degree programmes: 55 bachelor programmes, 110 master programmes, 3 diploma programs and 13 doctoral programmes. In the academic year 2013/14, the university awarded 7,745 first degrees (Bachelors and Diplomas), 1,424 Master's degrees and 568 Doctoral degrees. The university offers a number of Masters programs in English, including Quantitative Economics, Management and Finance, Science-Technology-Society, Environmental Sciences, Middle European interdisciplinary Master Programme in Cognitive Science, European Master in Health and Physical Activity, English Language and Linguistics, Anglophone Literatures and Cultures, East Asian Economy and Society, Economics, Botany, Ecology and Ecosystems, Molecular Biology, Microbial Ecology and Immunobiology, European Master in Urban Studies, Masters in European and International Business Law, Mathematics, etc.

Some 6,900 scholars undertake the research and teaching activity of the university. Of these, approximately 1,000 engage actively in projects financed by third parties. The main fields of research at the university cover a wide spectrum of subjects: Catholic and Protestant Theology, Law, Economic Sciences and Computer Science, Philological-Cultural Studies and Historical-Cultural Studies, Social Sciences and Psychology, Life Sciences and Natural Sciences, Mathematics, Sports Sciences and Teacher Education.

Faculties and centres
The University of Vienna consists of 15 faculties and five centres:
 Faculty of Catholic Theology
 Faculty of Protestant Theology
 Faculty of Law
 Faculty of Business, Economics and Statistics (not to be confused with the Vienna University of Economics and Business)
 Faculty of Computer science
 Faculty of Historical and Cultural Studies
 Faculty of Philological and Cultural Studies
 Faculty of Philosophy and Education
 Faculty of Psychology
 Faculty of Social sciences
 Faculty of Mathematics
 Faculty of Physics
 Faculty of Chemistry
 Faculty of Earth Sciences, Geography and Astronomy
 Faculty of Life sciences

 Centre for Translation studies
 Centre for Sport science and University Sports
 Centre for Molecular biology
 Centre for Microbiology and Environmental Systems Science
 Centre for Teacher Education

Academic reputation

The University of Vienna has the highest ranking in Arts and Humanities, where it is placed 35th and 54th in the world according to the THE and QS ranking respectively. Outstanding subjects include Geography (ranked 28th globally in 2013), Linguistics and Philosophy (both 46th globally) and Law (ranked 32nd in Europe and 73rd globally). It is rated high in academic reputation and number of international students, but low in terms of faculty to student ratio and citations per faculty.

An overview of the QS World University Rankings by subjects:

The Times Higher Education World University Rankings by subjects:

Notable people

Faculty and scholars 

Nobel Prize Laureates who taught at the University of Vienna include Robert Bárány, Julius Wagner-Jauregg, Hans Fischer, Karl Landsteiner, Erwin Schrödinger, Victor Franz Hess, Otto Loewi, Konrad Lorenz and Friedrich Hayek.

The University of Vienna was the cradle of the Austrian School of economics. The founders of this school who studied and later instructed at the University of Vienna included Carl Menger, Eugen von Böhm-Bawerk, Friedrich von Wieser, Joseph Schumpeter, Ludwig von Mises and Friedrich Hayek.

Other famous scholars who have taught at the University of Vienna are: Theodor W. Adorno, Alexander Van der Bellen, Manfred Bietak, Theodor Billroth, Ludwig Boltzmann, Ulrich Brand, Franz Brentano, Anton Bruckner, Rudolf Carnap, Conrad Celtes, Adrian Constantin, Viktor Frankl, Sigmund Freud, Karl Samuel Grünhut, Eduard Hanslick, Edmund Hauler, Jalile Jalil, Leon Kellner, Hans Kelsen, Adam František Kollár, Johann Josef Loschmidt, Franz Miklosich, Oskar Morgenstern, Otto Neurath, Johann Palisa, Pope Pius II, Karl Popper, Elise Richter, Baron Carl von Rokitansky, Rudolf von Scherer, Peter Schuster, August Schleicher, Moritz Schlick, Ludwig Karl Schmarda, Joseph von Sonnenfels, Josef Stefan, Olga Taussky-Todd, Walter G. Url, Leopold Vietoris, Carl Auer von Welsbach, and Wilhelm Winkler.

Nobel laureates 

There are total 16 Nobel Prize Laureates affiliated to the university as follows:

Alumni
Some of the university's better-known students include: Friedrich Hayek, Kurt Adler, Franz Alt, Wilhelm Altar, Maria Anwander, Bruno Bettelheim, Rudolf Bing, Friedrich Cerha, Lucian Blaga, Hedda Bolgar, Josef Breuer, F. F. Bruce, Elias Canetti, Ivan Cankar, Otto Maria Carpeaux, Christian Doppler, Felix Ehrenhaft, Mihai Eminescu, Stephen Ferguson, Paul Feyerabend, Heinz Fischer, O. W. Fischer, Ivan Franko, Sigmund Freud, Adolf Albrecht Friedländer, Alcide De Gasperi, Hilda Geiringer, Kurt Gödel, Ernst Gombrich, Franz Grillparzer, Werner Gruber, Jörg Haider, Hans Hahn, Theodor Herzl, Hugo von Hofmannsthal, Edmund Husserl, Marie Jahoda, Max Jammer, Elfriede Jelinek, Maria Simon, Percy Julian, Karl Kautsky, Elisabeth Kehrer, Leon Kellner, Hans Kelsen, Hryhoriy Khomyshyn, Jan Kickert, Rudolf Kirchschläger, Arthur Koestler, Jernej Kopitar, Karl Kordesch, Arnold Krammer, Karl Kraus, Bruno Kreisky, Karl Samuel Grünhut, Anneliese Hitzenberger, Richard Kuhn, Hermann F. Kvergić, Paul Lazarsfeld, Ignacy Łukasiewicz, Gustav Mahler, Tomáš Garrigue Masaryk, Lise Meitner, Olga Ehrenhaft-Steindler, Gregor Mendel, Karl Menger, Franz Mesmer, Franz Miklosich, Alois Mock, Wolf-Dieter Montag, Matija Murko, Ioan Nicolidi of Pindus, Joachim Oppenheim, Eduard Pernkopf, Anton Piëch, Pope Pius III, Hans Popper, Karl Popper, Otto Preminger, Wilhelm Reich, Peter Safar, Monika Salzer, Mordkhe Schaechter, Karl Schenkl, Peter Schuster, Arthur Schnitzler, Marianne Schmidl, Andreas Schnider, Albin Schram, Joseph Schumpeter, Wolfgang Schüssel, John J. Shea, Jr., Mihalj Šilobod Bolšić, Felix Somary, Adalbert Stifter, Countess Stoeffel, Yemima Tchernovitz-Avidar, Eric Voegelin, Kurt Waldheim, Otto Weininger, Slavko Wolf, Eduard Zirm, Mordecai Sandberg, Calvin Edouard Ward, Paul Niel, Stefan Zweig, and Huldrych Zwingli.

See also 
 Education in Austria
 Klimt University of Vienna Ceiling Paintings
 Institute Vienna Circle
 List of medieval universities
 Ludwig Boltzmann Institut für Menschenrechte
 Roman Sebastian Zängerle
 Vienna Observatory
 Francis Stephen Award
 List of Jesuit sites

Notes and references

External links

 University of Vienna (English version)
 Information for Students at the University of Vienna (English version)

 
1360s establishments in the Holy Roman Empire
1365 establishments in Europe
14th century in Austria
Educational institutions established in the 14th century
Buildings and structures in Vienna
Universities and colleges in Vienna